The 2016 NBL season was the 35th season of the National Basketball League. The league's team total dropped to an all-time low for the 2016 season, with the departure of the Manawatu Jets leaving the competition with seven teams.

The 2016 pre-season tournament was held at the Te Rauparaha Arena in Porirua from Friday 26 February through Sunday 28 February. The four-team event featured the Canterbury Rams (2–1), Nelson Giants (3–0), Wellington Saints (0–3) and a Porirua invitational team (1–2). The regular season commenced on Thursday 10 March in Wellington with the Wellington Saints hosting the Super City Rangers at TSB Bank Arena. The season contained 12 weeks of regular season games and a Final Four series on Queens' Birthday weekend in June. As the only team based north of Hawke's Bay, the Rangers utilised two new 'home' venues around the Upper North Island, Te Awamutu and Whangarei, providing increased exposure for elite basketball in that area of the country.

The regular season concluded with the Rams earning a playoff berth for the first time since 2002 and their first minor premiership since 1993, while the Hawks recorded their first winless season in franchise history and joined the 1998 Northland Suns, 2009 Taranaki Mountainairs, 2010 Otago Nuggets and 2015 Taranaki Mountainairs as the only sides in NBL history to go an entire season without a win.

For the first time in the competition's history, Invercargill hosted the Final Four weekend, with the semifinals on Friday 3 June, followed by the championship game on Saturday 4 June.

Team information

Summary

Regular season standings

Final Four

Awards

Player of the Week

Statistics leaders
Stats as of the end of the regular season

Regular season
 Most Valuable Player: McKenzie Moore (Canterbury Rams)
 NZ Most Valuable Player: Marcel Jones (Canterbury Rams)
 Most Outstanding Guard: McKenzie Moore (Canterbury Rams)
 Most Outstanding NZ Guard: Shea Ili (Wellington Saints)
 Most Outstanding Forward: Marcel Jones (Canterbury Rams)
 Most Outstanding NZ Forward/Centre: Marcel Jones (Canterbury Rams)
 Scoring Champion: Eric Devendorf (Super City Rangers)
 Rebounding Champion: Alex Pledger (Southland Sharks)
 Assist Champion: McKenzie Moore (Canterbury Rams)
 Rookie of the Year: Logan Elers (Taranaki Mountainairs)
 Coach of the Year: Ross McMains (Taranaki Mountainairs)
 All-Star Five:
 G: McKenzie Moore (Canterbury Rams)
 G: Raymond Cowels (Nelson Giants)
 F: Torrey Craig (Wellington Saints)
 F: Marcel Jones (Canterbury Rams)
 C: Alex Pledger (Southland Sharks)

Final Four
 Finals MVP: Tai Wesley (Wellington Saints)

References

External links
 2016 fixtures
 Live broadcasting
 Southland to hold the 2016 NBL Final Four
 2016 season preview
 Round 1 preview
 Final Four preview
 Grand Final preview
 Grand Final re-watch
 Promise for Bay Hawks despite 0-14 record

National Basketball League (New Zealand) seasons
NBL